Sebastian Holzmann (born 22 March 1993) is a German World Cup alpine ski racer, and specializes in slalom.

Career 
Born in Bad Wörishofen, Bavaria, Holzman made his World Cup debut in January 2014 at age twenty and his best result is an eleventh place in March 2018 at Kranjska Gora.

He has competed in two World Championships, 
and finished fifth in the slalom event in 2023.

World Cup results

Season standings

Top fifteen results
 0 podiums; 0 top tens; 11 top twenties

World Championship results

References

External links

1993 births
Living people
German male alpine skiers
21st-century German people